The proportional rule is a division rule for solving bankruptcy problems. According to this rule, each claimant should receive an amount proportional to their claim. In the context of taxation, it corresponds to a proportional tax.

Formal definition 
There are n claimants. Usually, that is, the estate is insufficient to satisfy all the claims.

The proportional rule says that each claimant i should receive , where r is a constant chosen such that . In other words, each agent gets .

Examples 
Examples with two claimants:
 . That is: if the estate is worth 100 and the claims are 60 and 90, then , so the first claimant gets 40 and the second claimant gets 60.
 , and similarly .

Examples with three claimants:
 .
 .
 .

Characterizations 
The proportional rule has several characterizations. It is the only rule satisfying the following sets of axioms:

 Self-duality and composition-up;
 Self-duality and composition-down;
 No advantageous transfer;
 Resource linearity;
No advantageous merging and no advantageous splitting.

Truncated-proportional rule 
There is a variant called truncated-claims proportional rule, in which each claim larger than E is truncated to E, and then the proportional rule is activated. That is, it equals , where . The results are the same for the two-claimant problems above, but for the three-claimant problems we get:

 , since all claims are truncated to 100;
 , since the claims vector is truncated to (100,200,200).
 , since here the claims are not truncated.

Adjusted-proportional rule 
The adjusted proportional rule first gives, to each agent i, their minimal right, which is the amount not claimed by the other agents. Formally, . Note that  implies .

Note that that .

Finally, it activates the truncated-claims proportional rule, that is, it returns , where .

With two claimants, the revised claims are always equal, so the remainder is divided equally. Examples:

 .
 .
 .

With three or more claimants, the revised claims may be different.

See also 
 Proportional division
 Proportional representation

References 

Bankruptcy theory